Caquena is one of the cantons of the Tahua Municipality, the second municipal section of the Daniel Campos Province in the Potosí Department of Bolivia. During the census of 2001 it had 325 inhabitants. Its seat is Caquena, situated at the Salar de Uyuni and west of Tunupa volcano.

See also 
 Isla del Pescado
 Inkawasi Island

References

External links
Tahua Municipality: population data and map

Cantons of Potosí Department
Cantons of Bolivia